De Groote is a Dutch surname meaning "the big one". It is most common in Flanders and sometimes is concatenated as DeGroote or Degroote. People with this name include:

Jan de Groote (1911–1989), Dutch farmer and politician
Koenraad Degroote (born 1959), Belgian politician
Melvin De Groote (1895–1963), American chemist and inventor with 925 patents
Michel De Groote (born 1955), Belgian football defender
Michael DeGroote (born 1933), Canadian businessman and philanthropist
Patrick De Groote (born 1958), Belgian politician
:fr:Paul De Groote (1905–1997), Belgian government minister
Steven De Groote (1953–1989), South African classical pianist
Thierry De Groote (born 1975), Belgian road bicycle racer
Wouter Degroote (born 1978), Belgian footballer

See also
De Groote Peel National Park, National Park in the Peel, a region in the Southeast of the Netherlands
DeGroote School of Business, faculty at McMaster University in Hamilton, Ontario, Canada
Michael G. DeGroote School of Medicine, medical school of McMaster University in Hamilton, Ontario, Canada

Dutch-language surnames
Surnames of Belgian origin